Pure Pwnage (pronounced "pure ownage")
was a Canadian Internet-distributed mockumentary series from ROFLMAO Productions. The fictional series purports to chronicle the life and adventures of Jeremy (played by Jarett Cale), a Canadian and self-proclaimed "pro gamer". In 2010, an adaptation of the web series began airing on Showcase, a Canadian cable television channel, but the series failed to be picked up for a second season.

Premise 
Pure Pwnage focuses on Jeremy, a pro gamer whose lack of experience in social interaction causes him to become selfish and lazy. His brother Kyle creates a documentary of Jeremy's interactions with the gaming and non-gaming world.

Cast

Episodes 

There are currently eighteen web episodes available to the public and eight TV episodes.

History 
Pure Pwnage was created by Geoff Lapaire and Jarett Cale who also play the show's main protagonists. Originating in 2004, eighteen Internet-distributed episodes of the series have been released to date. In 2007, the series creators estimated their current viewer base to be over three million. The series is filmed primarily in Toronto, Ontario, but has also included scenes filmed in Calgary, Alberta; Montreal, Quebec; Aurora, Ontario; Hamilton, Ontario; and the Netherlands.

During an interview, director Geoff Lapaire (although as "Kyle"; Lapaire maintained his "Kyle" identity among fans and media) insisted that all of the characters on the show are not acting. He suggested that the personalities on Pure Pwnage display their true-to-life abilities and eccentricities. The characters took great pains to maintain that the Pure Pwnage world is simply an extension of the real world. Lapaire has finally admitted that they are, in fact, actors. The sixth fanchat with the crew was out-of-character, where the fact that the characters within Pure Pwnage are exaggerated versions of the actors was confirmed.

On August 6, 2009, it was announced that a Pure Pwnage TV series had been commissioned by Showcase.  Upon the announcement, many members of the Pure Pwnage fan community raised concerns. The main complaints were that the series was only announced to be airing in Canada, and the assumption that it would be changed in order to appeal to viewers not familiar with internet culture. Jarett Cale, who writes the show and plays Jeremy, tried to quell the complaints on the Pure Pwnage forums, saying "We're doing our best to get it broadcast in the USA, UK, Australia, etc., but it's really up to each country's respective broadcasters. [...] Geoff and I are still the main creative force – we're producers and writers. We've also brought on many new people with experience in traditional television to help us out both story-wise and production-wise. FPS Doug will still be there, and he will still be played by Joel Gardiner." In response to a user asking if the TV series meant there would be no more web episodes, he said "Nope, it only means there's a new TV series."

Despite this, the future of the web series was uncertain. Geoff Lapaire, director of all previous episodes of Pure Pwnage, left the show in September 2008 to focus on the then-unannounced TV series, and Troy Dixon, who played T-Bag in the series, died in a car accident on December 6, 2008. Jarett Cale announced in January 2009 that work on the next web episode had begun, with him as the director, however, the episode has not been released.

In a short Livestream cast on March 15, 2010, a user posted a comment regarding the web series and Jarett replied that the web series is back in production and is in progress. He has not given out an ETA.

On January 19, 2011, Jarett announced on the Pure Pwnage forums that the TV series had not been picked up for a second season. Additionally, the web series has been put on indefinite hold. In his own words: "My hope that Pure Pwnage will see a proper ending to its illustrious web series has nearly vanished. I've let Geoff know that should he be willing at any time to resume some of his traditional, critical roles on the web series I will fly home to Toronto in a heartbeat to help make it happen."

On September 18, 2012 The Pure Pwnage YouTube channel uploaded a video titled "010100100100010101010100010101010101001001001110" which is a binary encoding of the word "Return", signalling the return of the Pure Pwnage.

Pure Pwnage Teh Movie
On September 19, 2012, an official crowd funding campaign was announced to aid in the funding of a Pure Pwnage movie. The $75,000 goal was raised in just over 24 hours, due to overwhelming support from fans all over the world. At the end of the campaign, a total of $211,300 was raised.

On November 22, 2015, the official trailer was released. The movie premiered in Toronto on January 23, 2016, at the Bloor Cinema. Further screenings took place around the US and in the UK.

On May 7, 2016, Pure Pwnage Teh Movie was released for streaming and digital download via Vimeo.

Reception and awards 
Pure Pwnage Teh Movie received the Canadian Comedy Awards 2016 award for best feature film. The film was well-received by general audiences.

Spin-offs

TV series 
On August 6, 2009, it was announced that a Pure Pwnage TV series had been commissioned by Showcase. The announcement was made in the form of a mini-episode where Kyle tries to convince Jeremy to stop playing on his Nintendo DS Lite and make the announcement. The series had been teased for several months under the name "Project X". The TV series premiered on Showcase March 12, 2010, and premiered on Australia's ABC2 on October 4, 2010. According to creator Jarett Cale, the TV series itself takes place in a fictional world within the Pure Pwnage universe (webseries) where Kyle ironically got a TV series, thus explaining the lack of consistency between shows.

Jeremy's Mail Sac 
Starting in March 2010, the Pure Pwnage website began letting fans send Jeremy questions via e-mail. Jeremy then answered the fan questions in video segments posted on the website titled Jeremy's Mail Sac.

Pro at Cooking 
Starring Dave (Dawei) as himself, Pro at Cooking is a spin-off of Pure Pwnage. A cooking show for gamers with Dave hosting as the main chef. When his female assistants do not perform as expected, Dave constantly fires each one of them usually after every episode. Directed by Davin, it has only aired seven 5- to 10-minute episodes. No other characters from Pure Pwnage, excluding Dave, Davin, and Geoff, appear on the show.

Pure Pwnage: The Comic 
From February 28, 2006 to March 7, 2007, the Pure Pwnage website featured a regularly issued comic, of which a new page was released once every two to three weeks. Apparently set in the "real world" rather than in the fictional world of Pure Pwnage, the comic breaks most of the fourth wall of the show. For example, Dave said in the show that he was leaving it due to unfinished business in China, the comic claims that the real reason was that he had found a new job in Vancouver.

However, both the show and comic clearly contain elements that are either symbolic representations of reality (for example, pwning an opponent with "micro balls" as a possible metaphor for pwning them in an actual video game) or are not based in reality whatsoever.

Pure Pwnage: Teh Movie 
In September 2012, series creators Jarett Cale and Geoff Lapaire announced an indiegogo campaign to raise funds for a Pure Pwnage feature-length film. Within 24 hours of the campaign being launched, the project had received its goal of $75,000, and by the end of the campaign, they had reached a total of $211,300. Despite this being a relatively small film budget, Jarett Cale and Geoff Lapaire have said that with their experience of making the web series with an extremely limited amount of funds, they are confident that they would be able to make a quality film shot in countries across the world, mentioning hopes of filming in South Korea. Pre-production began in earnest in early 2013, with weekly twitch.tv live streams in which Lapaire, Cale, and guests such as Joel Gardiner (fps_doug) and Miranda Plant (Tagi) discuss the film and interact with fans.

The film also featured Nathan Adams as an Accounting Associate, Ajay Fry as himself, and actors Gwenlyn Cumyn, Thomas Finn, and Alberta Mayne

The film premiered on January 23, 2016, in Toronto, Ontario. Following this, Cale and Lapaire took the film to the road, screening the project around the world in a touring limited release.

On May 7, 2016, Pure Pwnage Teh Movie was released for streaming and digital download on Vimeo.

Notes

External links 

 
 Pure Pwnage Artchive

2004 web series debuts
2008 web series endings
2010 Canadian television series debuts
2010 Canadian television series endings
2010s Canadian satirical television series
2010s Canadian sitcoms
Canadian comedy web series
Canadian mockumentary television series
Showcase (Canadian TV channel) original programming
Television shows filmed in Toronto
Works about video games